is a Japanese artist and poet who also goes by the name 326. He created new artwork for the PR campaign of a Japanese television network, and designed the art for the video game Gitaroo Man.

Published works
You're My Mommy. Letters from a Baby to his Mom

References

Japanese artists
Japanese poets
Living people
Year of birth missing (living people)